Amedeo Rega (January 31, 1920 – 2007 in Rome) was an Italian professional football player.

His professional debut in the 1940/41 season for A.S. Roma remained the only Serie A game in his career.

1920 births
2007 deaths
Italian footballers
Serie A players
A.S. Roma players
S.S. Lazio players
A.C. Perugia Calcio players
U.S. Salernitana 1919 players
Catania S.S.D. players
Association football goalkeepers